Hallock-Bilunas Farmstead is a historic farm complex located at Jamesport in Suffolk County, New York. The farmstead includes seven contributing buildings: the farmhouse, barns, sheds, workshops, and other accessory structures.  The farmhouse was built in 1880, and is a two-story gable-roofed residence clad in wood shingles and wrapped by an open porch on the south and east elevations.

It was added to the National Register of Historic Places in 2003.

References

Houses on the National Register of Historic Places in New York (state)
Houses completed in 1880
Houses in Suffolk County, New York
National Register of Historic Places in Suffolk County, New York